Karin Franz Körlof (born Fransén Körlof, 18 April 1986) is a Swedish actress, playwright and director.

Biography
Körlof is the daughter of Anders Körlof and Anica Fransén, and the grandchild of lawyer Voldmar Körlof. She grew up in the Ytterby area in Kungälv and came into contact with acting when she was 14, when she got one of the main roles in the anti-drug film Brandstegen. In 2002–05 she participated in theater and film production at the Ale gymnasium. From 2005–07 she continued with a basic education (HNC) in acting and theater science at Dundee and Angus College, The Space, in Scotland, where she played in classics such as Shakespeare's As You Like It (Rosalind) and Oscar Wilde's The Importance of Being Earnest (as Lady Bracknell). She also appeared in the short film End of Patrick Bullet, filmed in Gothenburg. In 2009–10 she studied theater at Stockholm University, then acting at Stockholm Academy of Dramatic Arts in 2012–15.

Selected filmography
 The Crown Jewels (2011) as girl by the church
 Wallander (2013) as Alexia (1 episode)
 Nobody Owns Me (2013) as Maja (20 years old)
 Blue Eyes (2014–15) as Sofia Nilsson (10 episodes)
 A Serious Game (2016) as Lydia Stille
 The Wife (2017) as Linnea
 Vår tid är nu (2017) as Lilly (10 episodes)
 Greyzone (2018) as Linda Laaksonen (7 episodes)

Awards
 Berlin International Film Festival: EFP Shooting Star (2017)

References

External links

1986 births
Living people
People from Bohuslän
Swedish film actresses
Swedish stage actresses
Swedish television actresses
Swedish film directors
Swedish women film directors
Swedish screenwriters
Swedish women screenwriters